The Guangzhou Higher Education Mega Center Central Stadium is a stadium situated in the Guangzhou Higher Education Mega Center, Guangzhou, Guangdong province, China. It is used mostly for association football, but also for athletics, rugby union and rugby sevens.

It held rugby and football events at the 2010 Asian Games. Starting from 2013, it also held the China Women's Sevens as part of the IRB Women's Sevens World Series. The stadium has a capacity of 39,346, making it the third largest stadium in Guangzhou, after Guangdong Olympic Stadium and Tianhe Stadium. The Guangzhou Rams rugby tens team sometimes use the venue for their big games.

See also
Guangzhou Higher Education Mega Center

References

External links
Official site 
Stadium information 

Football venues in China
Rugby union stadiums in China
Sports venues in Guangzhou
Venues of the 2010 Asian Games